Collar days are designated days on which the collar forming part of the insignia of certain members of British orders of knighthood may be worn.  

Collars are special large and elaborate ceremonial metal chains worn over the shoulders, hanging equally over the front and back, often tied with a bow at the shoulders, with a distinctive pendant attached to the front.

Collar days in the United Kingdom
Collars are worn by members of the Order of the Garter, the Order of the Thistle; and Knights Grand Cross of other orders.  Of the latter, the only currently active orders are the Order of the Bath, the Order of Saint Michael and Saint George, the Order of the British Empire, and the Royal Victorian Order (the Order of Saint Patrick, the Order of the Star of India and the Order of the Indian Empire are now in abeyance). The collar can be worn on specific collar days throughout the year.

Collar days, in accordance with instructions of the Central Chancery of the Orders of Knighthood are:

Collars are also worn when the King opens or prorogues Parliament, and a few other observances; including religious services of the various orders, and by those taking part in the Ceremony of Introduction of a Peer in the House of Lords.

Notes

References

External links
 https://web.archive.org/web/20060925040501/http://www.cam.ac.uk/societies/cuhags/info/days.htm

Orders of chivalry of the United Kingdom
Chivalry